Paul Chocheprat (11 June 1855 – 31 March 1928) was a French naval officer who served during the First World War.

Early life
He was born in Périgny, Allier.

Career
He then joined the gunnery training ship-of-the-line  and then on the ironclad  in an evolution squadron  in 1875 before serving on the ironclad  to the Pacific Naval Division (1876) where he proved to be a remarkable hydrographer.

Ensign in August 1877 on the ironclad  in a squadron of evolutions, he went in 1878 on the aviso  as a maneuver officer at French Senegal and participated in expeditions on the Haut-Fleuve. Surviving a very violent bout of yellow fever, he entered in 1880 on the cruiser  in the flying and training division of Cherbourg and proved himself an excellent instructor.

Promoted to lieutenant in January 1882, he commanded the battery on the unprotected cruiser  then was sent to the general majority of Toulon. Officer of Admiral Benjamin Jaurès, he was appointed to the command of the evolutions squadron on the Richelieu in 1884 then became an instructor of the school of application for aspirants on the training cruiser  in 1885.

He then served as a maneuver officer on the ironclad . Second of the ironclad  in the division of the Mediterranean and the Levant, it passes on the Vauban in 1893 then on the ironclad  in 1894 where its qualities of maneuver are again noticed.

Commander of the aviso-transport Aube and the local station of Tahiti in 1895, he participated in the operations of Raïatea and Tahaa in January–February 1897 as well as missions to Samoa and New Hebrides.

In 1898, he was assigned to the staff at Cherbourg and in August became  (Captain). Commander of the pre-dreadnought battleship  in the Mediterranean (1899) then of the pre-dreadnought   in 1902, he carried out missions in Greece and on the coasts of Morocco before being promoted to chief of general staff of the naval army during the maneuvers from 1905–1906.

Rear-admiral in March 1907, he commanded the 4th division in the Mediterranean, then was promoted to vice-admiral and maritime prefect of Brest in October 1911. Maritime prefect of Toulon (November 1913), in 1914 he commanded the 1st wing in the army naval with flag on the semi-dreadnought battleship  and is then one of the main collaborators of Boué de Lapeyrère.

Member in 1916 of the Superior Council of the Navy, he accompanied Joffre on a mission to the United States and passed to the reserve cadre in June 1917.

From 1920 to 1922 he chaired the Société des Œuvres de mer.

Awards and distinctions
Knight (June 29, 1886), officer (11 July 1896), commander (12 July 1910) and grand officer of the Legion of Honor (31 December 1913)
Public education officer (1917).

References

Bibliography

1855 births
1928 deaths
French Navy admirals
French military personnel of World War I
Grand Croix of the Légion d'honneur
Admirals of World War I